Uneasy Money may refer to:
 Uneasy Money (novel), a 1916 novel by P. G. Wodehouse
 Uneasy Money (1918 film), an American silent romantic comedy film, based on the novel
 Uneasy Money (1926 film), a German silent film